Pilipenko or Pylypenko is a Ukrainian-language surname. Notable people with the name include:

 Anna Pilipenko (born 1988), Belarusian footballer
 Olga Pilipenko (born 1966), Russian politician
 Roman Pilipenko (born 1987), Kazakh water polo player
 Svitlana Pylypenko (born 1983), Ukrainian figure skater
 Viktor Pylypenko (born 2000), Ukrainian footballer

See also
 
 

Ukrainian-language surnames